Benjamin Tallmadge (February 25, 1754 – March 7, 1835) was an American military officer, spymaster, and politician. He is best known for his service as an officer in the Continental Army during the American Revolutionary War. He acted as leader of the Culper Ring during the war, a celebrated network of spies in New York where major British forces were based. He also led a successful raid across Long Island that culminated in the Battle of Fort St. George. After the war, Tallmadge was elected to the US House of Representatives as a member of the Federalist Party.

Early life
Tallmadge was born February 25, 1754, the son of Susannah Smith (1729–1768) and Rev. Benjamin Tallmadge Sr. (1725–1786), a clergyman in Setauket, New York, a hamlet of the Town of Brookhaven, New York, on Long Island. He graduated from Yale in 1773, where he was a member of Brothers in Unity and was a classmate and close friend of the American Revolutionary War spy Nathan Hale. He also served as superintendent of Wethersfield High School from 1773 to 1776.

American Revolutionary War

Tallmadge was a major in the 2nd Continental Light Dragoons and was initially commissioned on June 20, 1776. He was given the position of director of military intelligence by George Washington after Nathaniel Sackett was relieved of his duties because he did not gain any ground from the enemy. Tallmadge was in charge of bringing intelligence from British-controlled New York to the Continental army, and he did so by assembling a network of spies known as the Culper Spy Ring, with the help of Abraham Woodhull and Robert Townsend.

The Culper Ring was involved in revealing the betrayal of Benedict Arnold. Benedict Arnold's British contact John André was caught and taken to North Castle, where commander Colonel Jameson ordered lieutenant Allen to take the incriminating documents found with André to their commander Benedict Arnold at West Point. Tallmadge suspected André to be a spy and Benedict Arnold to be his accomplice, and he tried to have Jameson reverse his orders. He was unsuccessful, but did convince Jameson to send a rider and take Andre to Salem, eight miles east of the Hudson River and to send the documents to George Washington. Allen still reported to Benedict Arnold with Jameson's note outlining the events. Later, Jameson was chastised by Washington for warning Arnold and allowing his escape. André was placed in Tallmadge's custody awaiting execution.

On November 21, 1780, Tallmadge and his dragoons rowed across Long Island Sound from Fairfield, Connecticut, to Cedar Beach in Mount Sinai, New York. The next day, they proceeded to the south shore where they captured and burned down Manor St. George. On their march back to Mt. Sinai, Tallmadge stopped in Coram, New York, and ordered the burning of 300 tons of hay which the British had been stockpiling for the winter. George Washington, on hearing the news, sent the following letter to Tallmadge:
I have received with much pleasure the report of your successful enterprise upon fort St. George, and was pleased with the destruction of the hay at Coram, which must be severely felt by the enemy at this time. I beg you to accept my thanks for your spirited execution of this business.

Tallmadge served at Washington's headquarters from March 1781 until the Continental Army was disbanded in November 1783. He was admitted as an original member of The Society of the Cincinnati in the state of Connecticut when it was established in July 1783 and brevetted to the rank of lieutenant colonel on September 30, 1783. He subsequently served as Assistant Treasuer (1785–1789), Treasurer (1789–1793), Vice President (1793–1796) and President (1796–1801) of the Society of the Cincinnati in the state of Connecticut and continues to be represented by a living descendant in the society today.

Later life

Career
In 1792, Tallmadge was appointed postmaster of Litchfield, Connecticut. He served until he resigned to assume his seat in Congress. He established a successful mercantile and importing business and was the first president of the Phoenix Branch Bank, a position he held from 1814 to 1826.

House of Representatives
On March 4, 1801, Tallmadge succeeded William Edmond as a Federalist Party member of the US House of Representatives to represent Connecticut's at-large congressional district. He served until March 3, 1817, when he was succeeded by Thomas Scott Williams.

In 1829, Tallmadge was among a group of Federalists who defended Uriah Tracy against accusations by John Quincy Adams and William Plumer. Adams and Plumer had claimed Tracy was a leader of an 1804 effort to lead New England to secede from the United States.

Personal life
Tallmadge married Mary Floyd (1764–1805) on March 18, 1784, daughter of William Floyd, a signer of the Declaration of Independence and a U.S Representative from New York. Their children included:
 William Smith Tallmadge (1785–1822), a lieutenant colonel in the 46th United States Infantry in the War of 1812; he died unmarried in Moscow, New York
 Henry Floyd Tallmadge (1787–1854), who married Maria Andrews Canfield (b. 1800), daughter of Andrew Adams
 Maria Jones Tallmadge (1790–1878), who married John Paine Cushman (1784–1848), a member of the House of Representatives from New York's 10th congressional district
 Benjamin Tallmadge (1792–1831), who died unmarried near Gibraltar while a lieutenant in the United States Navy
 Frederick Augustus Tallmadge (1794–1869), who married Elizabeth H. Canfield (1793–1878)
 Harriet Wadsworth Tallmadge (1797–1856), who married John Delafield (1786–1853), brother of Edward Delafield and Richard Delafield
 George Washington Tallmadge (1803–1838), who married Laura Pease (1807–1893), daughter of Calvin Pease

Death
Mary died in 1805, and Tallmadge married Maria Hallett (d. 1838) in 1808, daughter of his friend Joseph Hallett.  Tallmadge died March 7, 1835, in Litchfield, Connecticut.  He is buried in East Cemetery in Litchfield, Connecticut.

Legacy
Fort Huachuca, Arizona, is the home of Army intelligence, and Tallmadge Hall there is named in Tallmadge's honor. The town of Tallmadge, Ohio, is also named in Tallmadge's honor. The Boy Scouts of America's Benjamin Tallmadge District serves the north shore of Eastern Long Island.

Talmadge, Maine is named for Tallmadge, who owned the township in the early 1800s.

Tallmadge is a main character in the AMC series Turn: Washington's Spies, played by Seth Numrich.

Tallmadge is portrayed by Dave Morrissey, Jr. in the 2017 feature film One Life to Give and its sequel Traitor created by TBR News Media.

See also
 Intelligence in the American Revolutionary War
 Intelligence operations in the American Revolutionary War

Footnotes

Further reading
 Benjamin Tallmadge, Memoir of Col. Benjamin Tallmadge (Reprint Services Corporation, 1858) 
 Charles Swain Hall, Benjamin Tallmadge: Revolutionary Soldier and American Businessman (Columbia University Press, 1943)
 Mark Allen Baker, Spies of Revolutionary Connecticut, From Benedict Arnold to Nathan Hale (The History Press, 2014)

External links
 Benjamin Tallmadge Collection
 
 The Society of the Cincinnati
 The American Revolution Institute

1754 births
1835 deaths
Continental Army officers from Connecticut
American bankers
Yale College alumni
Spymasters
Federalist Party members of the United States House of Representatives from Connecticut
People from Setauket, New York
Military personnel from Connecticut
People of the Province of New York
American spies during the American Revolution